Adamjee Export Processing Zone also known as Narayanganj EPZ is a special economic zone for producing export oriented products located in the industrial city of  Siddhirganj, Bangladesh. Established in 2006, it has 245 acres of land with 229 industrial establishments.  It is the 6th-largest special economic zone in Bangladesh

Location 

Admjee EPZ located in Adamjinagar, Siddhirganj is 15 km from capital city Dhaka. It is 27 km from Hazrat Shahjalal International Airport and 255 km from the Port of Chittagong.

Facility and utility service 
It is a completely duty free zone for production and an export-oriented special economic zone.
Adamjee Export processing zone have  Water Supply: Treated water through Treatment Plant.  Gas Supply From Titas Gas Transmission & Distribution Company Ltd. Tariff Power Supply : Own Sub-station. 11 kV.

Investment and export 
 total investment in  Adamjee EPZ was $397 million and total export value is $2,251,190,000.

References 

Foreign trade of Bangladesh
Naryanganj